David Butler (born 1 January 1964) is an Irish novelist, short story writer, playwright, poet and actor. He has won several literary prizes, such as the Ted McNulty Award from Poetry Ireland and the Féile Filíochta International Award and the Fish Short Story Award.

Reception
Butler's work has been generally well received by critics, with a reviewer for the Sunday Times describing the main character of The Judas Kiss as being "among the more outlandishly repulsive creations of recent Irish fiction." Author Pat McCabe wrote of City of Dis, which was shortlisted for the Kerry Group Irish Novel of the Year 2015,  “David Butler's compelling mythic, metaphysical X-ray is beautifully written and ought to cement his already growing reputation.” while for the Kirkus Review, the award-winning novel is “A dark romp featuring delightfully crackling dialogue and the mental gymnastics of a protagonist so on edge he tries to silence a yowling cat with poison.”

Awards and honors
2001: Poetry Ireland's Ted McNulty Prize 
2002: Brendan Kennelly Award
2004: Poetry Ireland Féile Filíochta International Poetry Festival
2013: SCDA ‘Play on Words’ One Act Drama Award
2014: Fish Short Story Award
2015: Cork Arts Theatre Writers’ Award
2016: ITT/Redline Short Story Award
2020: Maria Edgeworth Poetry Award
2021: Benedict Kiely Short Story Award
Two-times' winner of the Maria Edgeworth Short Story Award

Bibliography

Fiction
The Last European (2005)
The Judas Kiss (2012)
No Greater Love (2013)City of Dis (2014)Fugitive (2021)

PoetrySelected Poems: Fernano Pessoa (2004)Via Crucis (2011)All the Barbaric Glass (2017)Liffey Sequence (2021)

Non-FictionAn Aid to Reading Ulysses (2004)Joyce / Pessoa: The Mirror and the Mask'' (2004)

References

1964 births
Living people
21st-century Irish dramatists and playwrights
Irish male dramatists and playwrights
21st-century Irish poets
Irish male short story writers
Irish LGBT poets
Writers from Dublin (city)
21st-century Irish novelists
Irish male novelists
Alumni of University College Dublin
Alumni of the University of Essex
Irish LGBT dramatists and playwrights
Irish LGBT novelists
Irish male poets
21st-century Irish short story writers
21st-century Irish male writers
21st-century Irish LGBT people